Zhu Yijun (born 29 March 2005) is a Chinese badminton player. He is the reigning World Junior champion in both the men's and mixed doubles categories.

Achievements

World Junior Championships 
Boys' doubles

Mixed doubles

BWF Junior International (2 titles) 
Boys' doubles

Mixed doubles

  BWF Junior International Grand Prix tournament
  BWF Junior International Challenge tournament
  BWF Junior International Series tournament
  BWF Junior Future Series tournament

References

External links 

2005 births
Living people
Badminton players from Shanghai
Chinese male badminton players